A Khazar ruler (probably the bek), mentioned in the Schechter Text and the Khazar Correspondence, Benjamin was the son of the Khazar ruler Menahem and probably reigned in the late ninth and early tenth centuries CE. 

The only extant account of Benjamin's reign comes from the Schechter Text, whose anonymous author reported a war between Benjamin's Khazars and a coalition of five nations: 'SY, TWRQY, 'BM, and PYYNYL, who were instigated and aided by MQDWN. "MQDWN", or Macedon, is used in medieval Jewish documents to refer to the Eastern Roman Empire, particularly under its Macedonian dynasty (867-1025). "TWRQY" can be identified with the Oghuz on Khazaria's eastern flank. The other three entities are less easily identifiable. In Khazarian Hebrew Documents of the Tenth Century,  Omeljan Pritsak argued that "PYYNYL" was actually "PTzNK" Pecheneg, the misreading ascribed to the degradation of the letter itself. He further identified 'SY with the Asya, who he connects to the Burtas (traditionally allies of the Khazars) and 'BM with the remnants of the Onogurs and Bulgars still living in the Pontic steppes. The Schechter Text identifies the Alans as Benjamin's only allies in this war, stating that many of the Alans had adopted Judaism by that time.

The term "Asya" has been thought by some scholars to describe the Arsiya, suggesting the possibility of a Muslim revolt or attempted coup against Benjamin.

Benjamin's son was Aaron II.

References

Kevin Alan Brook. The Jews of Khazaria. 2nd ed. Rowman & Littlefield Publishers, Inc, 2006.
Dunlop, Douglas M. The History of the Jewish Khazars, Princeton, N.J.: Princeton University Press, 1954.
Golb, Norman and Omeljan Pritsak. Khazarian Hebrew Documents of the Tenth Century. Ithaca: Cornell Univ. Press, 1982.

External links
Bibliography of Khazar Studies

Khazar rulers
Jewish royalty
Jewish monarchs
10th-century rulers in Europe
9th-century rulers in Europe
9th-century Jews
10th-century Jews